is a former Japanese football player.

Club statistics

Personal life
On 28 February 2010 was announced that the 24-year-old Japanese is injured with the Osteosarcoma at the knee. Whether the defender can continue his career is still uncertain.

References

External links

1985 births
Living people
Komazawa University alumni
Association football people from Saitama Prefecture
Japanese footballers
J1 League players
Omiya Ardija players
Association football defenders